The legacy of the Great Famine in Ireland ( or An Drochshaol, litt: The Bad Life) followed a catastrophic period of Irish history between 1845 and 1852 during which time the population of Ireland was reduced by 50 percent.

The Great Famine (1845–1849) was a watershed in the history of Ireland. Its effects permanently changed the island's demographic, political and cultural landscape. For both the native Irish and those in the resulting diaspora, the famine entered folk memory and became a rallying point for various nationalist movements. Modern historians regard it as a dividing line in the Irish historical narrative, referring to the preceding period of Irish history as "pre-Famine".

Political and cultural impact

In Ireland
Political reaction resulting from the Great Irish Famine was muted, because of the extremely limited electoral franchise that existed at the time. Irish politics in the 1820s to 1840s had been dominated by the Catholic Emancipation and "Repeal" movements under Daniel O'Connell. (The Independent Irish Party, formed in June 1852, disintegrated within four years, but it was in major decline from 1853 when tenants benefited from a recovery in agricultural prices.)

Outside the mainstream, too, reaction was slow. The 1848 Young Ireland rebellion under Thomas Davis, though occurring at the start of the Famine, was hardly impacted upon by the Famine, as much as by the clash between the "constitutional" nationalism and Catholicism of O'Connell and the pluralist republicanism of Davis. Another rebellion would not occur again until the 1860s under the Fenians/Irish Republican Brotherhood. Historians have speculated that, such was the economic and social impact on Ireland, the nation was numbed into inaction for decades afterwards; in other words, that politics mattered less to people than survival after the traumatic experiences of the late 1840s and early 1850s.

Though its electorate was a small part of the population (as elsewhere in the United Kingdom of Great Britain and Ireland), those Irish privileged to vote continued until the mid-1870s to vote for the two major British political parties, the Conservatives and the Liberals, with more votes and seats going to the latter, even though it had been the party of government during the Famine. The introduction of the secret ballot in 1872 enabled the Home Rule League to largely replace the Liberals in Irish politics in 1874. The Home Rule League was reconstituted as the Irish Parliamentary Party, under Charles Stewart Parnell in the 1880s; Parnell was also instrumental in establishing the Irish Land League, to achieve land reform. A large body of voters continued to vote for unionists, who wished to maintain the Union that joined Britain and Ireland.

The British Royal Family avoided some censure, due to their perceived impotence in political affairs. Although some believed the myth that Queen Victoria (known in Ireland in later decades as the "Famine Queen") had only donated a miserly £5 to famine relief, in fact the sum was £2,000, the equivalent of £61,000 today, from her personal resources. She also was patron of a charity that fundraised. On instruction of the Lord Lieutenant of Ireland Victoria made what was largely seen as a propaganda visit in 1849. However, this visit was conducted under stringent security measures and was not free from protests or controversy. The celebrations associated with her visit  just after the famine were compared to "illuminating a graveyard" in a newspaper editorial at the time.

An additional social impact due to the high numbers of children orphaned was that for some young women, prostitution was one of few options available. Some of these young women became known as Wrens of the Curragh.

Linguistic consequences

It is estimated that one and a half million people died during the Famine and that a million emigrated between 1846 and 1851. A large proportion of these were Irish speakers, and the poorest districts, from which emigration continued to flow, were generally Irish-speaking. The Famine was not the only reason for the decline of the language (the general exclusion of Irish from public life and the influence of the English-speaking clergy and middle classes also played a part) but it was a conspicuous element. This led to the creation of an Ireland which thought of itself as essentially English-speaking, though with a persistent and influential reaction in the form of organisations such as the Gaelic League and the growth of a network of urban Irish-speaking activists from the late nineteenth century on.

In pre-Famine Ireland Irish was the language both of a rich folk culture and a strong literary tradition. The latter persisted in the form of Irish language manuscripts containing both prose and poetry: a single collection would give the reader access to a substantial part of the literature. Many such manuscripts were taken to America by emigrants in the 1840s and after.

The emigration of numerous Irish speakers to America as an immediate or long-term result of the Famine led to a movement there for the maintenance of the Irish language. This was marked in part by the foundation of Philo-Celtic Societies and the founding of the monthly journal An Gaodhal in 1881, the first such publication anywhere in which Irish was extensively used.

Irish emigrants abroad

If the political elite in Ireland remained tolerant of British political parties and the monarchy, emigrants were not so. Many Irish emigrants to the United States quickly associated with separatist republican groups and organisations like the IRB. The political liberties and freedom of opportunity they encountered in the States confirmed for them the potential of an independent Ireland and often made them more passionate and optimistic than some of their brethren at home.

The Famine and its causes became a major platform for emigrant anger, as it was the main cause for most of them being emigrants in the first place. John Mitchel, a journalist by trade (who had written for Thomas Davis's newspaper, The Nation before leaving to set up his own paper, only to be arrested, tried for sedition and transported to the penal colony of Van Diemen's Land) who continued to campaign against British rule in Ireland after moving to the United States. Analysing the famine, he wrote:

Mitchel's commentary expressed the anger felt by many emigrants, who saw themselves as the dispossessed, forced from Ireland by a famine they blamed on British government policies. The famine became a constant issue with Irish Americans, who to an extent unrivalled among other emigrant communities in the United States, remained emotionally attached to their native land. Leaders such as John Devoy in later decades came to play a major role in supporting Irish independence. It was no accident that the President of Dáil Éireann, Éamon de Valera in 1920 chose to travel to the United States, not elsewhere, in his efforts to get the Irish Republic recognised and accepted, or that when Michael Collins launched special bonds to fund the new Republic, many were sold to Irish Americans.

Genocide

During and after the famine, some commentators have claimed that the British government's response, while it occurred, amounted to genocide, a contention which is disputed. American professor of international law and human rights campaigner Francis Boyle has claimed in his 2011 work United Ireland, Human Rights and International Law that the famine amounted to genocide by the British government, a view which was supported by historian James Mullin. However, numerous Irish, British and American scholars, such as academics F. S. L. Lyons, John A. Murphy, R. F. Foster, and James S. Donnelly Jr., as well as historians Cecil Woodham-Smith, Peter Gray, Ruth Dudley Edwards, and Cormac Ó Gráda have denied claims of a deliberate policy of genocide. All historians generally agree that British policies during the Famine (particularly those applied by the Ministry of Lord John Russell) were misguided, ill-informed, and counter-productive, and that had a similar crisis occurred in England instead of Ireland then the government's response would have been different.

There are public records that there was enough grain and meal in Ireland during that period to have prevented the food shortage caused by the potato blight.  Famine conditions were allowed to continue for a number of years in the 1840s, while the surplus food was not distributed. Some have claimed that because emigration was allowed, the Famine period does not qualify as genocide. The poverty, evictions, workshops where workers paid off the cost of their tickets, and the overcrowding and unhygienic conditions on emigration ships, all combined to make the journey of emigrating as great a risk as staying and trying to survive starvation. By modern definitions, the term "refugee" would be more accurate than "emigrant" to describe those who fled Ireland.

Commemorations

Ireland commemorated the 150th anniversary of the Great Famine in the 1990s. It was a contrast, in many ways, with the 100th anniversary in the 1940s. Then, only a few commemorations were held – the most significant of which was a commissioned volume of Famine history edited by R. Dudley Edwards and T. Desmond Williams (though not published until 1956), and the important 'Famine Survey' undertaken by the Irish Folklore Commission in 1945. Beyond these important cultural aspects, emigration was a continuing and embarrassing fact of Irish political life in the 1940s, and there was no natural constituency for the famine victims, who had died or emigrated. Some commentators were embarrassed that their ancestors had somehow fed themselves by inevitably not sharing food with the victims, a form of "Survivor guilt". 

The 1990s marked a significant shift in attitudes towards commemorating the Famine, as hundreds of events took place in Ireland and throughout the Irish diaspora, some of which received sponsorship from the National Famine Commemoration Committee based in the Department of the Taoiseach, led by TD Avril Doyle. At the Great Famine Event held in Millstreet, a statement from British Prime Minister Tony Blair was read aloud, apologising for the failure of past British governments to adequately address the crisis. A large number of new famine studies were produced, many detailing for the first time local experiences. Historians re-examined all aspects of the Famine experience; from practical issues like the number of deaths and emigrants, to the long-term impact it had on society, sexual behaviour, land holdings, property rights and the entire Irish identity, personified in the conservatism of Cardinal Cullen, that persisted into the 1900s. 

In 2010 Britain failed to send a diplomatic representative to the opening of the National Famine Commemoration, while 14 other nations did. The Taoiseach and President also did not attend in person, but sent staff members.

The Famine in song
The Famine is also commemorated in song, both from the period and from modern times. Irish novelist and songwriter, Brendan Graham has written a number of novels and songs on An Gorta Mór – the Great Irish Famine. His book publishing deal with HarperCollins originated from a number of songs he had written about An Gorta Mór, resulting in the publication of his best selling 'documentary novel' of the Famine – The Whitest Flower (HarperCollins, London, Sydney, Toronto, 1998). The Sunday Times, Canberra called The Whitest Flower – 'An important addition to the Irish national story'. The Whitest Flower, with its song 'soundtrack', was a required text for Boston's MIT Women's Studies Course. Along with its sequel The Element of Fire (HarperCollins, 2001), The Whitest Flower was also listed as 'support fiction' for Ireland's Leaving Certificate, History syllabus.

"The Voice" written by Brendan Graham and performed by Eimear Quinn won the 1996 Eurovision Song Contest for Ireland. The lyrics refer to Ireland's troubled history and point clearly to Famine times in Ireland, I am The Voice of your hunger and pain.

As well as entering the British Pop Charts, The Voice was one of the songs studied for the UK GCSE Music Syllabus, 1998. Eimear Quinn's version featured in the Pierce Brosnan movie – The Nephew, while the song found a new life in America with the recording and widespread PBS broadcasting of it as part of the group Celtic Woman's rise to prominence there.  Author and sociologist E. Moore Quinn in her book 'Irish American Folklore in New England', published in 2009, quotes the full lyric of The Voice.

"The Fairhaired Boy" – This song written by Brendan Graham was recorded by Cathy Jordan and Dervish on their 2003 album, 'Spirit'. Carmel Conway also recorded the song on her 2009 album 'This Beautiful Day'. It is also performed in the 'Cois Tine – Stories of Liam O' Flaherty' – by singer and violinist Fionnuala Howard. A song of emigration from Ireland during Famine times, The Fairhaired Boy tells of the sorrow of parting – 'Soon you'll in California be or Colorado bound'. In The Whitest Flower, Graham's heroine Ellen sings the song to Roberteen, a young neighbour from Ireland whom she finds dying in the lazaretto (fever shed) at Canada's Quarantine Island of Grosse Ile. The song is written in a traditional narrative style song form where there are no choruses, the hook of the song being contained in the last line of each stanza with the pull of the story being used to keep the listener's interest alive.

"Crucán na bPáiste" – 'the burial place of (unbaptised) children' – lies on a hilltop in Maamtrasna, Co. Mayo, overlooking Lough Nafooey, and Lough Mask in Ireland. It is a lament by a mother for a child she buries there during Aimsir an Drochshaoil ('The Time of the Bad Life' – the Famine). The song was written by Graham for Ellen Rua, one of the characters in his second novel,  The Brightest Day, The Darkest Night, also published by HarperCollins. It has been recorded and performed by a number of artistes most notably Karen Matheson (as part of the Transatlantic Sessions), Cathy Jordan of Dervish and Eimear Quinn. Graham reveals the story of how the song came to be written in his Sunday Miscellany radio piece for RTÉ, called Effin' Songs, recorded live in Ireland's National Concert Hall, with Eimear Quinn and the RTÉ Concert Orchestra and piper Neil Martin, following with the song itself.

"Crucán na bPáiste had become a claw in my gut – and my pilgrimage. Over many months it inched out in me its cry...focal by focal...line by line...until I was set free and it had found its epiphany. I had learned to keep out of the way...let the song write itself. This, I suppose is the real answer to the question with which we started. The truly special songs write us...we don't write them; we don't find them...they find us".

Another of Graham's Famine songs, "Ochón an Ghorta Mhóir / Lament of the Great Hunger", was commissioned by the Irish Government, as part of the Ceól Reoite (Frozen Music – after Goethe's 'Architecture is frozen music') Millennial Project. Fourteen Irish composers were asked to pick a monument of national significance and to write a piece of music/song which would release from it the music frozen within. Graham chose the Curvilinear Glasshouses at Dublin's National Botanic Gardens, constructed at the time of An Gorta Mór, by monies diverted from research to find a cure for the potato blight afflicting Ireland. The glasshouses looked down over the Gardens' 'vegetable patch', where the blight was first discovered in Ireland in August 1845. Graham has described the 'frozen music' locked within the architecture of the Curvilinear Glasshouses as 'a lament for a famished people'. A song for unaccompanied voice it has been recorded by Róisín Elsafty, on the Ceól Reoite album and as a 'hidden track' by Cathy Jordan on the Dervish album, Spirit. The song was also performed by Nuala Ní Chanainn in the 2002 production of Aistir/Voyage by the Swiss-based, Cathy Sharp Dance Ensemble.

"You Raise Me Up" – It was in fact reading Graham's novel The Whitest Flower, that led Norwegian composer, Rolf Lovland to contact Graham with a melody. This melody in turn inspired Graham to write the lyric – You Raise Me Up, which has been recorded by some 400 artists (including Westlife, Josh Groban, Brian Kennedy and Secret Garden, Daniel O'Donnell, Helene Fischer, Il Divo, Russell Watson and Paul Potts) and has become one of the most successful songs in popular music history.

Brendan Graham has also recently written a number of integrated song and narrative pieces including Writing the Famine in Fiction and Song, for The National Famine Commemoration Week in Ireland, 2010. This was narrated by the author with songs performed by Cathy Jordan accompanied on piano by Feargal Murray.

In Quebec, 2011, his shorter narrative and song piece – From Famine to Freedom – Ireland to Grosse Ile – was performed by the Quebec Symphony Orchestra and soloist Méav Ní Mhaolchatha, with Graham's narration translated into French. It included a first performance with orchestra of The Whitest Flower, Graham's title song for the soundtrack to his book. In response to the view handed down at the time of Ireland's Famine that "The judgement of God…sent the calamity to teach the Irish a lesson, that calamity must not be too much mitigated" (Charles E. Trevelyan – Permanent Assistant Secretary at the British Treasury with prime responsibility for Famine relief in Ireland), Graham's song calls to task a vengeful God:

In August 2012 Brendan Graham composed and presented From Famine to Freedom – Ireland to Australia, a commemoration in word and song of those who suffered during An Gorta Mór – The Great Irish Famine – and of those who fled the Famine to establish a new life Australia. Graham wrote a new song called, "Orphan Girl", dedicated to the memory of the 4,112, mainly teenage Irish orphan girls, who were given a free passage to Australia from Workhouses in every county of Ireland between 1848 and 1850. Brendan Graham was joined by Australian singer-songwriter, Sarah Calderwood who unites classic with contemporary folk. She is the charismatic front woman of Australia's premier Celtic group, Sunas, who released the ABC best-selling debut album ‘As Night Falls’. Graham and Calderwood were also joined on the day by the inspirational Australian Girls Choir, who have previously performed for Nelson Mandela, Oprah Winfrey, Queen Elizabeth II and President Obama. The commemoration in words and song was a community day of celebration and remembering, especially for those who are descendants of these Irish Workhouse young women. For more information see www.irishfaminememorial.org

More recently in March 2013 The Possible Dreams Choir toured Victoria in Australia, singing "Orphan Girl" (sung by Fortunate and Nomcebo) and "You Raise Me Up" as part of their Voices for the Voiceless tour. Possible Dreams International, Inc is a non-profit organisation which partners with rural and remote communities in Swaziland, Southern Africa to empower families and individuals living with extreme poverty, malnutrition and endemic disease. So in Graham's "Famine in Song" lyrics, there resonates a global reach.

A famous modern song on the famine is "The Fields of Athenry", by Pete St. John. Written in three verses, it deals with a fictitious but realistic story of "Michael" being deported to Botany Bay for stealing corn to feed his starving family. Performed in folk, traditional and even reggae versions, it is often sung by supporters of Glasgow's Celtic F.C., many of whom are of Irish descent. The song itself sums up the sense of despair, anger and bitterness of famine victims. The song was also covered by Boston punk rock band, the Dropkick Murphys on their 2003 Blackout album.

Luka Bloom's song 'Forgiveness' from his album Salty Heaven is sung from the point of view of an Irish Famine refugee who has relocated to Canada and who despite his suffering has chosen forgiveness over bitterness.

Luka Bloom's brother Christy Moore also has a song, written by Bloom but recorded by Moore, called 'The City of Chicago,' that chronicles the effects of the Famine and the subsequent mass emigration.

Pagan metal band Primordial also have a song about the Famine named "The Coffin Ships" on their 2005 album The Gathering Wilderness.

Another related song is "Famine" by Sinéad O'Connor, released on the Universal Mother album. The lyrics emphasise the political aspect of the famine.

Ireland and modern famine relief

Ireland has been at the forefront of international famine relief.  In 1985 Bob Geldof, Irish rock star and founder of Live Aid, revealed that the people of Ireland had given more to his fundraising efforts per head of population than any other nation in the world. Irish NGOs Goal, Concern, Trócaire and Gorta play a central role in helping famine victims throughout Africa. In 2000, Bono, lead singer with Irish band U2, played a central role in campaigning for debt relief for African nations in the Jubilee 2000 campaign. The Irish famine experience continues to influence many Irish people in their attitudes towards the developing world and famine victims everywhere.

Footnotes

Further reading
 Greener Grass: The Famine Years (2009 novel)
 Kevin Baker, Paradise Alley
 Marita Conlon-McKenna, Under the Hawthorn Tree
 Joseph Lee, The Modernisation of Irish Society (Gill and Macmillan)
 F.S.L. Lyons, Ireland Since the Famine
 James H. Murphy, Abject Loyalty: Nationalism and Monarchy in Ireland During the Reign of Queen Victoria (Cork University Press, 2001)
 Joseph O'Connor, Star of the Sea
 Liam O'Flaherty, Famine

External links 
Gratitude to the Ottomans
'Queen Victoria's £5': the strange tale of Turkish aid to Ireland during the Great Famine

Great Famine (Ireland)
Great Irish Famine